Nesbyen is a municipality in Viken county, Norway.  It is part of the traditional region of Hallingdal.  The administrative centre of the municipality is the village of Nesbyen.

The parish of Næs was established as a municipality on 1 January 1838 (see formannskapsdistrikt). The area of Flå was separated from Nes on 1 January 1905 to become a separate municipality.

General information

Name
The municipality (originally the parish) is named after the old Nes farm (Old Norse: Nes—now the village of Nesbyen), since the first church was built there.  The name is identical with the word nes which means headland.  Prior to 1889, the name was spelled "Næs".

Coat-of-arms
The coat-of-arms is from modern times.  They were granted on 29 June 1979. The arms show a yellow-gold triangle pointing to the left on a red background.  This represents a sandy peninsula or headlands (yellow triangle) formed by the confluence of two rivers: Rukkedøla and Hallingdalselva.  The design is canting because this is what the name of the municipality means (see above under the name).

History
Ancient routes went to Vestlandet through Valdres and Hallingdal and down Røldal to Odda. Reflecting this route, Hallingdal and its neighboring valley of Valdres were originally populated by migrants from Vestlandet and spoke a western dialect. In recognition of this, Cardinal Nicholas Breakespear, who was in Scandinavia as papal legate in 1153, included these two valleys in the diocese of Stavanger.

Geography
The municipality lies in the valley and traditional district of Hallingdal. It is bordered on the north by the municipality of Gol, on the east by Sør-Aurdal, on the southeast by Flå, on the southwest by Nore og Uvdal, and to the west by Ål.

The majority of the residents live in the villages of Nesbyen, Espeset, Eidal, Sjong, Børtnes, Bromma, Svenkerud, and Liodden.

Climate
Nesbyen has a boreal climate, bordering on a humid continental climate, with fairly warm and pleasant summers and cold winters. On 20 June 1970, Nesbyen recorded the all-time high for Norway ; the record low  was recorded 13 January 1914. The weather station Nesbyen-Todokk started recording in 2003; there have been weather stations in Nesbyen recording temperature since 1897.

Attractions

Hallingdal Museum (Hallingdal Folkemuseum) is located in Nesbyen. Hallingdal Folk Museum,  founded in 1899, is one of the oldest open air museums in Norway. It has a large and unique collection of buildings and artifacts from farms in Hallingdal. Special mentions is houses like Staveloftet, built around 1340, from the Stave farm and Trøymstua from about 1645, coming from Hemsedal.

There is an old meteor crater just north of Nesbyen (about 6 kilometres north and then 4 kilometres into the woods). About 650 million years ago, a  meteorite struck this area. This resulted in a  impact crater and an enormous amount of outpouring of energy by the impact.

Notable residents

 Hans Gude (1825-1903) painter, mainstay of Norwegian romantic nationalism
 Eilif Peterssen (1852-1928) a Norwegian painter of landscapes and portraits
 Marcelius Haga (1882–1968) Mayor from 1919 to 1934 and during the war
 Margarete Bonnevie (1884—1970) a Norwegian author, feminist and politician
 Olaf Øen (1925-2009) politician, Mayor of Nes 1963-1977
 Odd Bakkerud (1931–1989) a Norwegian fiddle player
 Lars Roar Langslet (1936–2016) politician, Minister of Education and Church Affairs
 Kristin Hille Valla (born 1944) teacher, school director and politician
 Pål Gunnar Mikkelsplass (born 1961) a cross-country skier, silver medallist at the 1988 Winter Olympics

See also
Nesbyen IL

References

External links

Municipal fact sheet from Statistics Norway

Nesbyen tourist office

Nes, Buskerud
Hallingdal
Municipalities of Viken (county)